The Worst Movie Ever! is a 2011 American action comedy film written, produced, directed by, and starring Glenn Berggoetz.

Plot
A suburban neighborhood is invaded by stereotypes of common horror film characters.

Cast
 Glenn Berggoetz as Johnny, Petey, Dr. Lars Coolman
 Eileen Barker as Laduelia
 Stuart Goldstein as Bobby
 Haidyn Harvey as Erica
 Bryce Foster as Brent
 Christopher Irvin as Dr. Dirk Ramrod
 Christine Mascolo as Angela
 Kasha Fauscett as Kristin
 Jeff Johnson as The Dark Overlord
 Jonathan Jorgensen as Santa Claus
 Carla Cannalte as Debbie
 Giovanna Leah as Running Woman
 Jeff McBride as Grocery Boy, Abe Lincoln
 Diane Henry as Petey's Girlfriend

Critical response
IFC wrote that the film lives up to its title and that it holds the possibility of becoming a cult hit, by writing that it is "quickly becoming the stuff of Internet legend as the worst grossing movie ever, a sales hook that plays nicely with that title. In the week of August 26, 2011, almost 70,000 people watched the film's trailer on YouTube. If even a fraction of those folks become curious enough to seek the film out, we could have a new cult hit on our hands." Since reporting of the film's lackluster premiere, the film's trailer has become a "mini-hit on YouTube" and initiated "something of a cult following on Facebook." The film's director has stated that the low gross was not intended as a publicity stunt, and resulted from both the film being scheduled to screen as part of the theater's monthly "midnight screenings", and through problems in stirring interest in the theatrical release.

Release
The film had its festival premiere at the Van Wert Independent Film Festival in Van Wert, Ohio on July 8, 2011, where director Glenn Berggoetz spoke at a breakfast symposium and hosted a midnight screening of the film.

The film had its theatrical premiere on August 19, 2011, in a single cinema, the Laemmle Sunset 5 in Los Angeles, resulting in the theater's worst box office results ever: just one paid admission and grossing just $11. After its release, the film gained notoriety for its extremely low viewership. This figure makes it the lowest opening film in history, beating the 2006 film Zyzzyx Road which attracted six patrons and $30 in revenue during its opening week.  According to the websites Boxofficemojo and The Numbers, the film has now grossed over $25,000 in box office revenues.

According to director Glenn Berggoetz, the film sold just one ticket over the weekend (for the sole Saturday screening) and nobody attended the Friday screening.

Attempts by the theater owner and filmmaker to locate the individual who paid to see the film over its opening weekend have so far failed.

References

External links
 

2011 films
2011 action comedy films
2010s musical films
American action comedy films
American musical comedy films
2010s English-language films
2010s American films